Amphibamus is a genus of amphibamid temnospondyl amphibians from the Carboniferous (middle Pennsylvanian) of North America. This animal is considered to have been close to the ancestry of modern amphibians. Its length was about 20 cm.

Gallery

References

Amphibamids
Dissorophids
Carboniferous temnospondyls of North America
Taxa named by Edward Drinker Cope
Fossil taxa described in 1865
Prehistoric amphibian genera